Zakaria Kutsnashvili (born 13 February 1972) is a Georgian politician who is a Georgian Dream Member of the Parliament of Georgia.

He was educated at Tbilisi State University.

Biography
Kutsnashvili was the Deputy Director General of Insurance Company "Argan" in Legal Issues. He worked in the Parliament of Georgia, was a member of Tbilisi Sakrebulo, Member of the Parliament of the 1999 Convention . Since 2005, he has been the chairman of the association "Law for the People". From 2007 he is a lecturer at Caucasus School of Law and Head of the Legal Service of the Patriarchate of Georgia. In 2012 Parliament of Georgia became a majoritare of the Tianeti district and chairman of the faction "Georgian Dream". 2019 On 21 June Kutsnashvili left mandate. 

He has a wife and a son.

References

1972 births
Living people
Tbilisi State University alumni
Members of the Parliament of Georgia
21st-century politicians from Georgia (country)
Georgian Dream politicians